Timeless is the debut album by American jazz fusion guitarist John Abercrombie. It was released in 1975 by ECM Records.

Overview
The album was recorded with Jack DeJohnette on drums and Jan Hammer on organ, piano, and synthesizer.

Reception
The Allmusic review by Scott Yanow gave the album 4½ stars, calling it, "Thought-provoking and occasionally exciting music that generally defies categorization".  The Penguin Guide to Jazz gave the album 4 stars, noting, "There's more filigree than flash on the early Timeless and it's left to DeJohnette and the underrated Hammer to give the set the propulsion it calls for... this is a session that has grown in stature with familiarity, an altogether tougher and more resilient  label debut than anyone remembers." The Rolling Stone Jazz Record Guide said, "Hammer especially plays with astounding fire and grace on this session, some of the finest organ playing he's recorded."

Track listing

Personnel
 John Abercrombie – guitar
 Jan Hammer – organ, piano, synthesizer
 Jack DeJohnette – drums

References

1975 debut albums
John Abercrombie (guitarist) albums
ECM Records albums